Education in the British Crown Dependencies is a devolved matter with each of the dependencies having separate systems that are autonomous but dependent on England for models and examples.

For details of education in each dependency, see:

 Education in Guernsey
 Education in Jersey
 Education in the Isle of Man

References

Education in the United Kingdom